Animazement is an annual three-day anime convention held during May at the Raleigh Convention Center in Raleigh, North Carolina. It is traditionally held over Memorial Day weekend. The convention is designed to be family-friendly. Animazement is run by unpaid staff and volunteers.

Programming
The convention typically offers an artist alley, classes, concerts, cosplay chess, cosplay contests, dealers room, gaming tournaments, manga library, masquerade ball, musicians, panel discussions, raves, various gaming rooms (arcade, console, retro), video screenings, and voice actors.

Animazement raised over $12,000 for several charities in 2015.

History
The convention originates from a 1997 36-hour anime marathon, organized by the Triangle Area Anime Society (TAAS) at North Carolina State University. It was first held in Raleigh, North Carolina at the North Raleigh Hilton in 1998, moved to the Sheraton Imperial Hotel and Convention Center in Durham, North Carolina for 2001, and to the month of May in 2002. In 2009, four Japanese guests canceled appearances due to quarantine concerns over the Swine flu. In 2009, Animazement moved to the Raleigh Convention Center. Noboru Ishiguro was scheduled to attend the 2012 event, but died prior to the event. The convention celebrated its 20th anniversary in 2017.

Animazement was canceled in 2020 and 2021 due to the COVID-19 pandemic.

Event history

References

External links
 
 Animazement Website

Anime conventions in the United States
Recurring events established in 1998
1998 establishments in North Carolina
Annual events in North Carolina
Festivals in North Carolina
Culture of Raleigh, North Carolina
Tourist attractions in Raleigh, North Carolina
Culture of Durham, North Carolina
Tourist attractions in Durham, North Carolina
Conventions in North Carolina